The following page lists most dams in Sri Lanka. Most of these dams are governed by the Mahaweli Authority, while the Ceylon Electricity Board operates dams used for hydroelectric power generation. Hydroelectric dams, including small hydros accounts for nearly half of the installed power capacity of Sri Lanka.

Sri Lanka is pockmarked with many irrigation dams with its water resource distributed across nearly the entirety of the island for agricultural purposes via artificial canals and streams. Utilization of hydro resources for agricultural production dates back pre-Colonial era, with current crop productions now largely dependent on these water resources. 

Dams in Sri Lanka 

Privately owned "small-hydro" facilities (which are limited to a maximum nameplate capacity of ), are not included in this list. Nearly all hydroelectric dams are also used for providing water resource for irrigation purposes, hence for the sake of identifying the hydroelectric dams, any dam with hydroelectric involvement is stated as such in the below table, even if the primary purpose of building the dam is to retain water for irrigation.

See also 

 Electricity sector in Sri Lanka
 List of power stations in Sri Lanka
 List of rivers of Sri Lanka

References

External links 
 Mahaweli Authority of Sri Lanka

 
 
 
Sri Lanka
Dams